Claude of Lorraine (6 October 1612 – 2 August 1648) was a daughter of Henry II, Duke of Lorraine, and Margherita Gonzaga, her sister was Nicole, Duchess of Lorraine. She married her first cousin and was the Duchess of Lorraine by marriage.

Marriage

She married her first cousin Nicholas II, Duke of Lorraine, at Lunéville on 18 February 1634 and had the following children: 

 Ferdinand Philippe, Hereditary Prince of Lorraine, jure matris Duke of Bar (29 December 1639 – 1 April 1659)
 Charles Léopold, Duke of Lorraine (3 April 1643 – 18 April 1690); married Eleonora Maria of Austria and had issue;
 Anne Eléanore de Lorraine (12 May 1645 – 28 February 1648) died in infancy
 Anne Marie Thérèse de Lorraine (30 July 1648 – 17 June 1661); Abbess of Remiremont, no issue;
 Marie Anne de Lorraine (born 30 July 1648, date of death unknown).

Claude Françoise died in Vienna aged 35, having given birth to twins, Marie Anne and Anne Marie. She was buried at the Church of Saint-François-des-Cordeliers, Nancy, Lorraine.

Ancestry

|-

1612 births
1648 deaths
Claude Francoise
Claude Francoise
Deaths in childbirth
Claude Francoise
17th-century French people